Cristina Carrera, otherwise known as Cristy C. Road (born May 26, 1982) is a Cuban-American illustrator, graphic novelist, and punk rock musician whose posters, music, and autobiographical works explore themes of feminism, queer culture, and social justice. She primarily works as an illustrator and graphic novelist, but is also known for publishing a long-running zine about punk music and her life as a queer Latina. She has performed on the Sister Spit roadshow in 2007, 2009, and 2013 and was the lead vocalist and guitarist for the queercore/pop-punk band, The Homewreckers. She currently sings vocals and plays guitar in Choked Up.

Biography and influences
Road told Visual Resistance magazine that she began making zines at about age 14, saying, "I think integrating political ideas into my drawings was just a natural progression, cause I've thought of art as my primary craft since puberty. Whatever affects my life is usually what's represented in my art." From 1997 through roughly 2004, she published the zine Greenzine, which started as a fanzine about the band Green Day and eventually focused more on Road's identity, politics, and ideas. Deterred by the inaccessibility of "high art," she was drawn to the inclusivity and free-spirit of the punk rock community. The zine transformed into a manifesto about being a hyper-sexual, queer, Latina, abuse survivor and her journey towards self acceptance. Road graduated from the Ringling School of Art and Design in 2004 with a BFA in illustration and draws in a punk style, primarily using Micron Ink pens, Chartpak markers, acrylic paint, Gel Pens, and white-out. She told Punknews.org about her artistic influences, "All my favorite art growing up was bold graphic art, like Coop and John Kricfalusi of Ren and Stimpy. So, I was really motivated to create something that was a hybrid of that and epic painting like Frida Kahlo, Diego Rivera, Kathe Kollowitz and really classic illustration." Road discussed the impact of her queer and Cuban-American identity on her art and politics with website Autostraddle in 2013, saying, "It was difficult to find other gay people who felt completely discomfited and had no interest in assimilating towards mainstream/straight culture. And although punk was heavily straight— it also paraded around 'outcast' culture; and my discovery of punk included the discovery of a hugely queer punk scene in San Francisco/Oakland, CA. So basically, this inability to be out and this desire to exist somewhere outside of what I knew additionally sparked my interest in raising political and social  gender and sexuality."  She has published three books and one collection of post cards, as well as numerous concert posters, protest flyers, book covers, and logos.

Music
From 2008 to 2017, Road played guitar and sung in queercore pop punk Brooklyn band The Homewreckers. The band has since broken up and performed for the last time on March 18, 2017, at a benefit concert for The Audre Lorde Project. Road currently sings vocals and plays guitar in pop-punk band Choked Up. In 2021 Choked Up announced they signed to Don Giovanni Records.

Critical acclaim
Bitch magazine listed Road as a "Bitchlist" pick in 2005, writing that she created socially conscious art with "love, color, and punk rock grit."
Bluestockings Books articulated Road's style and impact in their 2006 review of Indestructable, "Cristy's rad illustrations and incisive writing give voice to this true story about gender identity, cultural roots, mortality, and punk rock." Curve said of Indestructable: "So powerful is Road's candid portrayal of growing pains, it provides the perfect comfort for angsty, self-loathing youth and sends older readers back down memory lane through their own adventures and mishaps of young adulthood." Road's memoir "Bad Habits" was nominated for a LAMBDA Literary Award. One of her posters was featured in the Justseeds collection Celebrate People's History: The Poster Book of Resistance and Revolution. In 2012, website  Flavorwire named Road one of 50 "up and coming New York culture makers to watch in 2013," describing her as "a fixture in feminist, LGBT, and punk zinester circles."

Spit and Passion 
At its core, Spit and Passion is a coming out graphic memoir about Cuban identity and about the transformative moment when music saves an adolescent from their own angst. At twelve years old, Cristy Road is struggling to balance long standing Catholic Cuban traditions and family with her newfound queer identity. She begins an obsession with the pop punk band Green Day. A stunning graphic biography, Spit and Passion depicts the clash between her inner world of fantasy and the "numbing suburban conformity she is surrounded by."

Next World Tarot 
In 2017, Road successfully raised nearly $30,000 to fund her long-term passion project, Next World Tarot. Entirely hand-illustrated, this tarot deck features colorful portraits of queer and POC bodies in a post-apocalyptic existence. While producing the deck, Road also earned her master's degree in fine art illustration at Fashion Institute of Technology in New York City, where she focused her thesis on the history of tarot.

Published work
Bibliography adapted from Road's website.
 Indestructible (2006) 
 Distance Makes the Heart Grow Sick (Microcosm, 2008) 
 Bad Habits: A Love Story (Soft Skull Press, 2008) 
 Spit and Passion (Feminist Press, 2012) 

Anthology contributor
 We Don't Need Another Wave: Dispatches from the Next Generation of Feminists (2006)
 Baby Remember My Name  (2006)
 Live Through This (2008)
 Reproduce and Revolt (2008)
 Best Erotic Comics 2009 (2009)
 SIDE B: A Music Lover's Anthology  (2009)

References

External links
Official biography

1982 births
Living people
American memoirists
American women memoirists
American people of Cuban descent
American female comics artists
Feminist artists
Feminist musicians
American LGBT artists
American LGBT writers
LGBT comics creators
Artists from Miami
Queer women
Queer writers
21st-century LGBT people
21st-century American women
Don Giovanni Records artists